Muriel Boucher-Zazoui is a French coach and choreographer, and retired competitive ice dancer. She competed with Yves Malatier, and together they are the 1977 and 1978 French national champions. They competed twice at the European Championships, with the highest placement of 13th, which they achieved in 1978. They placed 15th at the 1978 World Championships.

She coaches in Lyon, France, often collaborating with Romain Haguenauer, who since 2014 has been based in Montreal, Canada. Her most successful former students include: 
 Marina Anissina / Gwendal Peizerat
 Isabelle Delobel / Olivier Schoenfelder/
 Nathalie Péchalat / Fabian Bourzat
 Marie-France Dubreuil / Patrice Lauzon (This Canadian team are now coaches in Montreal.)
 Anna Cappellini / Luca Lanotte
 Pernelle Carron / Lloyd Jones
 Pernelle Carron / Mathieu Jost
 Gabriella Papadakis / Guillaume Cizeron

Other current and former students include:
 Lucie Myslivečková / Neil Brown
 Tiffany Zahorski / Alexis Miart
 Louise Walden / Owen Edwards
 Élodie Brouiller / Benoît Richaud
 Nakako Tsuzuki / Kenji Miyamoto 
 Maureen Ibanez / Neil Brown
 Caroline Truong / Sylvain Longchambon
 Scarlett Rouzet / Lionel Rumi
 Laura Munana / Luke Munana
 Alessia Aureli / Andrea Vaturi
 Eve Bentley / Cedric Pernet
 Solene Pasztory / Andrew McCrary
 Pernelle Carron / Edouard Dezutter
 Magali Sauri / Michail Stifunin
 Amandine Borsi / Fabrice Blondel

Results
(ice dance with Yves Malatier)

References

French female ice dancers
French figure skating coaches
Figure skating choreographers
Living people
Year of birth missing (living people)